The 1950 Tasmanian state election was held on 6 May 1950.

Retiring Members

No MHAs retired at this election.

House of Assembly
Sitting members are shown in bold text. Tickets that elected at least one MHA are highlighted in the relevant colour. Successful candidates are indicated by an asterisk (*).

Bass
Six seats were up for election. The Labor Party was defending three seats. The Liberal Party was defending three seats.

Darwin
Six seats were up for election. The Labor Party was defending three seats. The Liberal Party was defending three seats.

Denison
Six seats were up for election. The Labor Party was defending three seats. The Liberal Party was defending one seat. One seat was being defended by independent MHA Bill Wedd. The final seat had been won by Rex Townley as an independent Liberal; he had since joined the Liberal Party.

Franklin
Six seats were up for election. The Labor Party was defending three seats. The Liberal Party was defending two seats. Independent MHA George Gray was defending one seat.

Wilmot
Six seats were up for election. The Labor Party was defending three seats. The Liberal Party was defending three seats.

See also
 Members of the Tasmanian House of Assembly, 1948–1950
 Members of the Tasmanian House of Assembly, 1950–1955

References
Tasmanian Parliamentary Library

Candidates for Tasmanian state elections